José Eduardo Rego Mendes Martins (born 9 December 1969, in Lisbon) is a Portuguese lawyer and politician. He is a former member of the Assembly of the Republic and also served as Secretary of State of Regional Development and Secretary of State of Environment during the 15th and 16th Constitutional Governments of Portugal, respectively.

References

External links
 Abreu Advogados

1969 births
People from Lisbon
20th-century Portuguese lawyers
21st-century Portuguese lawyers
20th-century Portuguese politicians
21st-century Portuguese politicians
Members of the Assembly of the Republic (Portugal)
Government ministers of Portugal
Living people